Beija Cachaça is a Brazilian cachaça, imported exclusively by Beija Corp, and produced in their facilities outside Sao Paulo, Brazil. Beija is an 80 proof, clear artisan cachaça that is distilled in Brazil. Beija was granted status as 'The World's First Virgin Cane Rum' by the Alcohol and Tobacco Tax and Trade Bureau in the summer of 2007.

The sugarcane used to create Beija is hand-harvested, pressed and enters distillation within at most 10 hours from the time it was harvested. The product is distilled a single time in small batches and is not aged in wooden barrels of any kind.

Origin of name
The name Beija is a conjugation of the Portuguese verb Beijar, meaning ‘to kiss’. Beija translates to English as ‘She Kisses’.

History
Beija Cachaça was launched in January 2008 by Kevin Beardsley and Steve Diforio.

Distillation
Beija Cachaça is a handcrafted blend of un-aged artisanal cachaças. Sourced from Minas Gerais and São Paulo, Beija's sugarcane is hand harvested, single pressed, and enters distillation on the same day, ensuring cachaça in the purest form.

Awards
 “Outstanding – 92 Points”  by Tasting Panel Magazine 
 Best in Class at the 2009 New York Spirits Awards, 
 Gold Medal at the 2008 International Rum Festival.

References

 Beija Cachaça

External links
 Official website
 "Rum Raisin", Boston Globe
 Beija Cachaca review- Liquor Snob
 Chillin' like a Brazilian, "Weekly Dig"

Brazilian brands
Distilled drinks